Pentagon Army Heliport  is a military heliport serving the Pentagon. It consists of a single pentagon-shaped helipad and is located on the northern side of the Pentagon building. It is used for ferrying VIPs such as military leaders and foreign guests to and from the Pentagon by helicopter.

References

Airports in Virginia
United States Army posts